Drosophila Fly Head is an outdoor 1988 sculpture by Wayne Chabre, installed on the University of Oregon campus in Eugene, Oregon, in the United States. The hammered copper sheet high-relief of a fly head measures approximately  x  x . It was surveyed by the Smithsonian Institution's "Save Outdoor Sculpture!" program in March 1993, though its condition was undetermined. The sculpture is administered by the University of Oregon.

See also

 1988 in art

References

1988 establishments in Oregon
1988 sculptures
Animal sculptures in Oregon
Copper sculptures in Oregon
 F
Insects in art
Outdoor sculptures in Eugene, Oregon
Sculptures by Wayne Chabre
University of Oregon campus
Heads in the arts